Basaula Lemba (born 3 March 1965) is a Congolese retired footballer who played as a midfielder.

Almost his entire professional career was spent in Portugal, mainly with Vitória de Guimarães.

Club career
Born in Kinshasa, Zaire, Lemba arrived in Portugal at the age of 21, signing with Vitória S.C. from AS Vita Club but having absolutely no impact in his first season – seven matches. He spent the following three campaigns also in the Primeira Liga, representing O Elvas C.A.D. and C.F. Estrela da Amadora.

Basaula – called by his first name whilst in Portugal – re-joined Vitória in 1990, becoming an important midfield element at the Minho club and sharing teams with countryman N'Dinga Mbote during his spell. In January 1995 he left for another side in the country, C.F. Os Belenenses, switching to F.C. Tirsense shortly after. After one year in the second division with Moreirense F.C. he moved to the lower leagues, representing two teams in the fourth level until his retirement at the age of 35.

International career
Lemba played for Zaire at the 1992 and 1994 editions of the Africa Cup of Nations, with both tournaments ending in quarter-final exits.

References

External links

1965 births
Living people
Footballers from Kinshasa
Democratic Republic of the Congo footballers
Association football midfielders
AS Vita Club players
Primeira Liga players
Liga Portugal 2 players
Vitória S.C. players
O Elvas C.A.D. players
C.F. Estrela da Amadora players
C.F. Os Belenenses players
F.C. Tirsense players
Moreirense F.C. players
União Montemor players
Democratic Republic of the Congo international footballers
1988 African Cup of Nations players
1992 African Cup of Nations players
1994 African Cup of Nations players
Democratic Republic of the Congo expatriate footballers
Expatriate footballers in Portugal
Democratic Republic of the Congo expatriate sportspeople in Portugal
21st-century Democratic Republic of the Congo people